
Year 659 (DCLIX) was a common year starting on Tuesday (link will display the full calendar) of the Julian calendar. The denomination 659 for this year has been used since the early medieval period, when the Anno Domini calendar era became the prevalent method in Europe for naming years.

Events 
 By place 

 Byzantine Empire 
 Arab–Byzantine War: Emperor Constans II signs a peace treaty with the Rashidun Caliphate. He uses the pause to strengthen his defences, and consolidates Byzantine control over Armenia. Constans establishes the themata, dividing territorial command in Anatolia.
 Constans II elevates his son Heraclius to the rank of co-emperor (Augustus), alongside his brother Tiberius.

 Asia 
 A Japanese embassy is sent to the Chinese Empire, and received in an audience by Emperor Gao Zong. The Tang Dynasty is determined in the next year to take administrative measures in regard to Japan. The envoys are detained.

 Middle East 
 The Battle of Nahrawan takes place between Imam Ali ibn Abi Talib and the Khawarij in Nahrawan, Iraq.

 By topic 

 Religion 
 March 17 – Gertrude of Nivelles, daughter of Pepin of Landen (mayor of the palace of Austrasia), requests on her deathbed a burial wearing a plain linen shroud. This is the traditional (pagan) practice of a 'furnished' grave.
 Leodegar, an opponent of Ebroin (mayor of the palace), is appointed bishop of Autun in Burgundy.

Births 
 Ali ibn Husayn Zayn, great-grandson of Muhammad and Shia Imam
 Cædwalla, king of Wessex (approximate date)
 Fujiwara no Fuhito, Japanese statesman (d. 720)
 He Zhizhang, Chinese poet (approximate date)

Deaths 
 March 17 – Gertrude of Nivelles, Frankish abbess (b. c.628)
 November 3 – Denha I of Tikrit, Syriac Orthodox Grand Metropolitan of the East.
 Bavo of Ghent, Frankish nobleman and saint (b. 622)
 Han Yuan, chancellor of the Tang dynasty (b. 606)
 Ishoyahb III, patriarch of the Church of the East
 Liu Shi, chancellor of the Tang dynasty
 Zhangsun Wuji, chancellor of the Tang dynasty

References